St. John's Episcopal Church is a historic church located at 154–158 W. High Street in Somerville, Somerset County, New Jersey. Built in 1895, it was designed by architect Horace Trumbauer in Early English Gothic style. St. John's Church Complex, which includes the church, rectory, and parish hall, was added to the National Register of Historic Places on May 30, 2003 for its significance in architecture and social history.

Gallery

See also
 National Register of Historic Places listings in Somerset County, New Jersey

References

External links
 
 

Somerville, New Jersey
Episcopal church buildings in New Jersey
19th-century Episcopal church buildings
Gothic Revival church buildings in New Jersey
National Register of Historic Places in Somerset County, New Jersey
Churches on the National Register of Historic Places in New Jersey
Churches in Somerset County, New Jersey
Churches completed in 1895
New Jersey Register of Historic Places